Petter Anker Stordalen Bjorvand (born 29 November 1962) is a Norwegian billionaire businessman, hotel and property developer and self-proclaimed environmentalist. He has an estimated net worth of US$1.3 billion stemming from investments in hotels, shopping centers and property. Stordalen owns Strawberry, a corporate group consisting of ten companies in real estate, finance, hotels and art. Through Strawberry Hospitality Group, Stordalen owns Nordic Choice Hotels, consisting of over 200 hotels and employing 17,000 people. In the later stages of his career, Stordalen has pursued a number of philanthropic endeavors together with his ex-wife, doctor and environmentalist Gunhild Anker Stordalen, donating large amounts of money to various charitable organizations within climate change and scientific research programs through the Stordalen Foundation, established in 2011. He has been a co-owner of SunClass Airlines since 2019.

Early life and education
Stordalen was born in Porsgrunn in Telemark, Norway to grocer Knut Anker Stordalen (1933–94) and Kari Stordalen. At the age of ten he began helping in his father's grocery store and at the age of twelve he began selling strawberries at the local market. He already then displayed his acumen for business, being named "Norway’s top strawberry seller" in the local paper, Porsgrunns Dagblad, in 1974, beating out his competition of 50- to 60-year-old market ladies. Following high school he attended Kjøpmannsinstituttet for one year, he then managed his father's store for a short time before going off to the Norwegian School of Marketing.

Career

Shopping centers
At 24 he took over what was, at the time, the largest shopping center in Norway, City Syd, in Trondheim as the country's youngest shopping center manager. After posting record profits at City Syd he became property director in Atle Brynestad's company Made in. As property director Stordalen was the architect behind the conversion of the former market area in downtown Trondheim and the re-launch of Liertoppen shopping centre outside Oslo. He was also put in charge of the Bik Bok brand

Following a number of transactions within the Brynestad system Stordalen, at the age of 29, found himself an employee of Realkreditt's (later DnB) property development company. Together with a group of investors Stordalen bought the historical department store Steen & Strøm in downtown Oslo. The group recouped their investment of NOK 20 million in the first five days of the reopening. The purchase of Steen & Strøm signaled the start of a wave of acquisitions, and in the span of three years the newly formed company, Steen & Strøm Invest, became the country's largest holder of commercial real estate. The expansion lasted until 1996 when Stordalen had a falling out with the largest shareholder, Stein Erik Hagen, and was asked to leave his position as CEO.

Hotels
After leaving Steen & Strøm Invest, Stordalen struck out on his own teaming up with investor Christen Sveaas. In October 1996 the duo bought 68 percent of the shares in the Scandinavian operations of Choice Hotels for NOK 100 million. At the time the chain consisted of 8 hotels across Scandinavia. Following the acquisition Stordalen started his expansion, following the same model as in Steen & Strøm Invest, buying Swedish hotel chain Home as well as Norwegian hotel company InterNor, and taking Choice Hotels Scandinavia public. During a three-year period Choice Hotels Scandinavia bought, on average, a new hotel every other week and added 50 people to the payroll every 10 days. In December 1997 Sveaas sold his 37 percent share of the now 77 hotels. In 1999 Christian Ringnes and his company Eiendomsspar acquired a 35 percent share in Choice Hotels Scandinavia. After a short power struggle, Ringnes folded and Stordalen cemented his control over the company. The same year Stordalen also saw the acquisition of several Swedish and Danish hotels, including the Danish hotel company Nordisk Hotel Group, Stenungsbaden Yacht Club and Stockholm Globe Hotel. At the turn of the millennium, at age 37, Stordalen became a billionaire(in Norwegian krone). In 2012 Stordalen opened his biggest hotel to date, the 500-room,  Clarion Post Hotel in Gothenburg, Sweden. At the opening 10,000 Gothenburgers were gathered to watch a light-and-fireworks display that included Stordalen ascending from the top of the hotel playing the drums inside a  disco ball. In 2022, Stordalen opened the 231-room, art-deco Somerro Hotel in Oslo, built from the 1930s office that previously belonged to Oslo Lysverker - the city's electrical company. The hotel is the first in Oslo to feature a rooftop pool and terrace, and is situated in Frogner, one of Oslo's oldest neighborhoods. The hotel also features a cinema, multiple restaurants and bars, a library, and a sauna.

From public to private company
In 2000 Stordalen formed the company Home Invest, consisting of the properties previously owned by Choice Hotels Scandinavia. The company went public, but was delisted in 2001. In 2003 Choice Hotels Scandinavia bought shares in Swedish property owner and developer Capona. In 2004 Stordalen's Home Invest sold 19 hotel properties to Capona with settlement in shares giving him a majority interest. In 2006 Capona changed name to Home Properties. In 2005 Home Invest bought the remaining shares in Choice Hotels Scandinavia and delisted the company. In 2006 Home Properties spun off Home Capital as an investment company and listed it on the First North Stock Exchange in Stockholm. In 2007, Stordalen's Home Invest acquired all the shares in Home Capital and delisted the company. In 2009, Stordalen did the same with Home Properties. In 2019, Nordic Choice Hotels acquired Kämp Collection Hotels.

Investments

Petter Stordalen's corporate group Strawberry, consists of:  
 Strawberry Group: Investment company that owns Strawberry Hospitality Group, Strawberry Advisory, Strawberry Properties and Strawberry Art & Design. In 2015, enterprise value of Strawberry Group was estimated at 16.9 billion NOK.
 Strawberry Hospitality Group, owning Nordic Choice Hotels: one of Scandinavia's largest hotel chain with 190 hotels in Norway, Sweden, Denmark, Finland and the Baltics. The company had 13,000 employees and turnover of NOK 10.4 billion in 2015.
 Strawberry Advisory: Owns Strawberry Capital and Strawberry Equity. Strawberry Capital, Home Capital until 2016, is an investment company, investing in listed and privately held companies in the Nordic capital market. Strawberry Equity is a private investment company, investing mainly in companies within the travel industry. In 2015, enterprise value of Strawberry Equity was estimated at 1.3 billion NOK.
 Strawberry Properties: Owns and develops 20 properties and  valued at 5.6 billion NOK.
 Strawberry Art & Design: Stordalen's art investment company, owning more than 400 pieces from Tony Cragg, Vik Muniz, Tracey Emin, Alex Katz, Franz West, Julian Opie and Andy Warhol, among others.
Strawberry Fields: Private real estate company, investing primarily hotel properties in large cities and capitals in the Nordics. Estimated enterprise value in 2015 was 9.8 billion NOK. Strawberry Fields owns Strawberry Forever and Strawberry Brothers.
Strawberry Forever: Real estate company, owning properties such as Quality Hotel Friends and Clarion Hotel Amaranten in Stockholm, Skt Petri in Copenhagen. Estimated enterprise value in 2015 is 6.2 billion NOK.
Strawberry Brothers: Real estate company established in 2015 and owned 50/50 by Stordalen and Varner Invest AS, owning properties such as Quality Hotel Globe in Stockholm, Clarion Hotel Royal Christiania in Oslo and the Copenhagen Central Post Building. Estimated enterprise value in 2015 is 3.6 billion NOK.
Strawberry Future: Investments in sustainability related initiatives, projects and organizations.
 PASAB: Joint venture with Norwegian property developers Anders and Arthur Buchardt, developing properties in Norway and Sweden.

Art collection
As his fortune grew, Stordalen started investing in art, mostly contemporary. His first buy was a painting by the American artist Ross Bleckner which still hangs at his private estate. In an interview in September 2012, renown Swedish curator Sune Nordgren stated that Stordalen was the European answer to American hotelier Steve Wynn. This partly due to the fact that Stordalen had "redefined" hotel art by spending in excess of five million dollars in contemporary art on his two latest hotels alone, Clarion Hotel Post in Gothenburg and Clarion Hotel & Congress in Trondheim - and have a private collection which is valued at around 30 million dollars. In January 2013 Stordalen opens a new hotel called The Thief, in the Tjuvholmen neighborhood in Oslo. Every one of the 119 rooms will have unique original art from artists like Sir Peter Blake, Chris Gianakos and Tony Cragg. On the interactive TV's guests will, supposedly as the world's first, be able to choose between pay-TV-options and contemporary video art. In one of the elevators there will be an animation by Julian Opie, one of Stordalen's favorite artists. In the library bar one will find a suite of pictures made by HM Queen Sonja of Norway. 
The Thief has signed a sponsorship-deal with the neighboring Astrup Fearnley Museum of Modern Art that gives the hotel access to the museums vast art library. Under the agreement, The Thief can borrow some signal work for strategic locations in the hotel.
Stordalen has world leading collections of artists like Jaume Plensa, Alex Katz and Franz West. He also owns some of Andy Warhol's best interpretations of Norwegian artist Edvard Munch. In the article the value of his total collections (private and business combined) was said to be more valued to more than 50 million dollars.
These are some of his known art possessions: Franz Wests «Lemure», Miwa Yanagis «Elevator Girls», Bård Breiviks «Partitur», Alex Katz' «Kirsten in a baseball hat», Jaume Plensas «Tattoo», Julian Opies «Suzanne Walking» and Damien Hirsts «Stamp Out Pleasure And Pain».

Business philosophy
Stordalen's business philosophy is based on 5 pillars 
 A corporate culture distinguished by energy, guts and enthusiasm
 Social responsibility
 Consumer power
 Capitalism
 Diversity
The foundation for his business philosophy, coined The strawberry philosophy, stems from a deeply formative memory selling strawberries for his dad during his childhood summers. When complaining to his dad about the quality of the berries his dad retorted "Sell the berries you have, they are the only berries you can sell" - so always making the most of the possibilities given to you, has been his guiding mantra through his business life.

He is well known for his annual winter conference for thousands of Nordic Choice managers usually held in Sweden. In addition to a big party that has previously included live camels, celebrities, and especially composed music and stage acts, Stordalen gives his employees a motivational speech that, in the media, has been likened to a religious revival.

Awards

 Scandinavian Businessman of the Year 2004
 Grand Travel Awards to Nordic for Best Scandinavian Hotel Chain (2007 and 2008) and Best Work Place (2007, 2008, 2009, 2010, and 2011)
 European Hotel Design Award 2008 for Stenungsbaden Yacht Club
 Sweden's most trusted brand 2008 from Reader's Digest - European Trusted Brands for Selma SPA
 Customer Excellence Award 2008 from Microsoft Business Solutions for Choice
 Ernst & Young Entrepreneur of the Year 2010
 Brightest Business Mind in Northern Europe 2016 by Nordic Business Forum
 Leader of the Year 2017, Grand Travel Award Sweden

Environmentalism
Stordalen first made his mark as an environmentalist in Norway supporting Norwegian NGO Bellona in the fight to free their expert Alexander Nikitin, charged with treason through espionage for his contributions to a Bellona report on nuclear safety within the Russian Northern Fleet. He has also participated in personal activism; in 2002 he broke into the UK nuclear treatment plant Sellafield and chained himself to the bridge of the plant for nine hours to protest the discharging of the radioactive element technetium-99 to the sea. In 2007 he was charged with trespassing after entering a restricted area at Malmøyakalven to protest the dumping of toxic mud in the Oslofjord.

Together with his wife, Gunhild Anker Stordalen he has founded the couple's philanthropic organization, The Stordalen Foundation. The Stordalen Foundation focuses primarily on climate change:

Rainforest Foundation Fund: Through the collaboration between Nordic Choice Hotels and Rainforest Foundation Norway the equivalent of 75 500 soccer fields of rainforest were conserved every year from 2010 to 2015.
Technological development: The Stordalen foundation supports the non-profit environmental organization Zero. At the annual Zero-conference in 2011 the couple secured their personal acquaintance Arnold Schwarzenegger as keynote speaker.
Renewable energy: In 2009 Petter Stordalen bought 67% of the shares in ECOHZ; an independent provider of Renewable energy with Guarantees of Origin. Today ECOHZ is the market leader, with an expected growth of 10% in 2012.
International Climate Agreements: The foundation supports the European Climate Foundation (ECF) and his wife Gunhild Anker Stordalen serves on the organization's supervisory committee. In January 2012 the couple participated in Al Gore's Climate Reality Project's expedition to the Antarctic
Consumer behavior: In June 2011 the couple founded GreeNudge. The purpose of the organization is to support and advance research on how climate initiatives, behaviorism, and communication interact. The goal of the foundation is to give decision makers the knowledge they need in order to implement effective climate policies.
All hotels in Stordalen's hotel company, Nordic Choice Hotels, are certified according to the ISO 14001 standard.
Stordalen's hotel company, Nordic Choice Hotels, is Executive Business Partner of the EAT Initiative.

Personal life
Stordalen lives in Oslo, Norway, and has three children with his first wife Ingrid; Emilie, Henrik and Jakob.

In 2010, Stordalen married Gunhild Anker Stordalen, a doctor and former model. On New Year's Eve 2008 Stordalen proposed on top of Aspen Mountain. The NOK 35 million (US$5 million) wedding was held in Morocco on 12 June 2010, making it Scandinavia's most expensive wedding. The lavish treatment of the guests included chartering an airplane and renting all the rooms of La Mamounia, one of the world's finest luxury hotels.  The ceremony was officiated by Bob Geldof in front of 240 of Norway's most prominent celebrities, from finance and the arts.  The wedding received press attention normally reserved for royal weddings; Norway's largest news website, VG Nett, had a protocol for the public to leave their greetings. The couple has since been dubbed the Bill and Melinda Gates of Norway by the Norwegian tabloids for their combination of business and philanthropy. In November 2019 the couple announced that they decided to separate but remain friends and continue some cooperations.

Following the Utøya shooting, on 22 July 2011, Stordalen donated NOK 5 million to the Norwegian Workers' Youth League to rebuild the summer camp.

Bibliography 
Jeg skal fortelle deg min hemmelighet. Published 2015

References

External links 

strawberrygroup.no

1962 births
Living people
People from Porsgrunn
Norwegian hoteliers
Norwegian businesspeople in real estate
Norwegian billionaires
Norwegian environmentalists